Circus is a Japanese visual novel studio known for creating adult-oriented bishōjo games. In addition to the normal Circus brand name, there are other brand divisions including Circus Northern, Circus Fetish, Circus Metal, and Sanctuary. Circus has also been involved in collaboration projects, creating titles such as True Tears, a collaboration with Broccoli, GameCrab, and illustrator Rei Izumi published under the brand La'cryma, and Sora o Tobu, Mittsu no Hōhō., an adult-oriented collaboration with Broccoli released under the same brand name.

On November 22, 2009, the headquarters went out of fire.

Brands
Circus Fetish
Circus Northern
FragiLe
STELLA
Sanctuary

Former brands
Joker
Maid Club (shut down in 2007)
k-ten
Circus Metal

Games produced

External links
 

Amusement companies of Japan
Hentai companies
Video game companies of Japan